Priscilla Paris (January 4, 1945 – March 5, 2004) was an American singer and songwriter. She had two sons, Edan and Seth.

Backed by her two older Paris Sisters, Albeth and Sherrell, Priscilla Paris is best remembered for the song, "I Love How You Love Me", an international hit in October 1961. She died unexpectedly in Pays de la Loire, France, as a result of a fall in her home.

Discography
Priscilla Sings Herself (1967) York Records
Priscilla Loves Billy (1969) Happy Tiger Records
Love Is (1978) Out Of Town Records
Love, Priscilla - Her 1960s Solo Recordings (2012) Ace Records

References

External links
Biography on spectropop.com

1945 births
2004 deaths
Accidental deaths from falls
Singers from San Francisco
20th-century American singers
20th-century American women singers
21st-century American women